William Sanday may refer to:

 William Sanday (theologian) (1843–1920), British theologian and biblical scholar
 William Sanday (RAF officer) (1883–?), British World War I flying ace